Aspen University is a United States-based private, for-profit, nationally accredited online university that was established in 1987. Aspen University offers undergraduate and graduate degrees in nursing, education, computer science, technology, information systems, business, project management, counseling, and criminal justice. Aspen Group, Inc. is a publicly held, for-profit post-secondary education company headquartered in New York, NY.  and owns two accredited universities, Aspen University and United States University.

Aspen Group, Inc. is publicly traded under the symbol , and had $67 million in revenue in the 2021 fiscal year.

History

Foundation 

The university was founded during the 1960s as the International Academy. In 1987, the International Academy established the Information Institute and changed the school's name to the International School of Information Management (ISIM), focusing on emerging information technologies. In 2003, ISIM changed its name to Aspen University.

Recent history 

Effective March 12, 2014, Aspen University's RN to BSN Program received CCNE accreditation.

In 2021, Aspen University in Arizona had nursing exam pass rates that were below the state standards. In 2022, students filed a class action suit, claiming the school had violated Arizona's Consumer Fraud Act.

In 2022, Aspen University suspended new enrollments to its pre-licensure nursing programs in Florida, Georgia, Tennessee and Texas.

Accreditation

Aspen University is accredited by the Distance Education Accrediting Commission (DEAC). The Distance Education Accrediting Commission (DEAC) is listed by the U.S. Department of Education as a nationally recognized accrediting agency, and is a recognized member of the Council for Higher Education Accreditation (CHEA).

The baccalaureate and master's degree in nursing at Aspen University is accredited by the Commission on Collegiate Nursing Education (http://www.aacn.nche.edu/ccne-accreditation).

Aspen University has been reviewed and approved as a provider of project management training by the Project Management Institute (PMI).

Aspen University's Bachelor's & Master's degrees in Psychology of Addiction and Counseling are approved by the National Association for Alcoholism and Drug Abuse Counselors (NAADAC).

The Colorado Commission on Higher Education (CCHE) has authorized Aspen University to operate in Colorado as a private university under the Degree Authorization Act.

Aspen University is not regionally accredited, and thus, degrees gained there may not be as widely accepted or transferable.

Some careers and career licenses require a regionally accredited degree. Generally, colleges with the same type of accreditation accept each other's courses and degrees. If a student attends a non-regionally accredited college, the majority of regionally accredited colleges will not accept that they have a "real" degree. For example, if they want to gain a master's degree, or work in a job that requires an undergraduate degree from a regionally accredited university.

Faculty
Aspen University has 34 full-time instructors and 345 part-time instructors for 9,563 students.

Academics

The school offers degrees at various levels in Psychology and Addiction Counseling,  Medical Management, various specialty degrees in Criminal Justice, Nursing, Early Childhood Education, Education,  Business Administration, Information Management, Information Systems, Information Technology and Computer Science.

Student outcomes
According to the College Scorecard, Aspen University has a 31 percent 8-year graduation rate.

External links

References

Private universities and colleges in Colorado
For-profit universities and colleges in the United States
Distance education institutions based in the United States
Online colleges
Universities and colleges in Denver
1987 establishments in Colorado
Distance Education Accreditation Commission